The 1929 Illinois Fighting Illini football team was an American football team that represented the University of Illinois during the 1929 college football season.  In their 17th season under head coach Robert Zuppke, the Illini compiled a 6–1–1 record and finished in second place in the Big Ten Conference. Guard Russ Crane was the team captain.

Schedule

References

Illinois
Illinois Fighting Illini football seasons
Illinois Fighting Illini football